The Denver Performing Arts Complex (also referred to as the "Arts Complex") is located in Denver, Colorado and is one of the largest performing arts centers in the United States. It is home to a professional theater company and also hosts Broadway musical tours, contemporary dance and ballet , chorales, symphony orchestras, opera productions, and pop stars.

The City and County of Denver’s Arts & Venues owns and operates the three largest theaters in the Arts Complex, the Ellie Caulkins Opera House, the Temple Hoyne Buell Theatre and Boettcher Concert Hall. The Helen Bonfils Theatre Complex within the Arts Complex is managed and operated by the Denver Center for the Performing Arts.

Performing arts organizations that regularly appear in the performance spaces include the Colorado Ballet, the Colorado Symphony, Opera Colorado and the Denver Center for the Performing Arts’ theatrical divisions — Denver Center Broadway and Denver Center Theatre Company.

Performance and other facilities
The Denver Performing Arts Complex houses the following performance spaces:

 The Ellie Caulkins Opera House is the main venue inside of the Quigg Newton Denver Municipal Auditorium. Its seating capacity is 2,225.
The Buell Theatre is designed for amplified musicals, dramatic plays and comedy acts. Its seating capacity is 2,884.
Boettcher Concert Hall is the nation's first symphony hall in the round, designed to place the audience close to the stage. Its seating capacity is 2,679.
 
Helen Bonfils Theatre Complex

The Wolf Theater is the largest of the four (4) theaters in the Bonfils Theatre Complex. It was previously known as the Stage Theatre. It has a seating capacity of 601. The theater features audio-enhancing walls and a thrust stage. It was remodeled in 2020-2021 and its current name honors long-time patrons and benefactors in Denver's theater community.

The Kilstrom Theater, renamed in 2021, was previously known as the Space Theatre. It was remodeled in 2017 with new wheelchair accessibility. 

The Singleton Theatre was previously known as the Ricketson Theatre. Recently renamed to honor William Dean Singleton, who was involved in the creation of the DCPA in its early years, it has been recently remodeled to include easier elevator access. It has 250 seats in a proscenium theatre. It was originally created as an art-house movie theater. 

The Jones Theatre features 200 seats and a thrust stage. It has a separate entrance on the outside of the building, near the intersection with Speer Boulevard. This theatre is often used for more experimental productions under the DCPA's Off-Center brand.

The Garner Galleria Theatre has a seating capacity of 210.    

The Donald R. Seawell Grand Ballroom is a pentagonal room with panoramic views of the mountains. This  facility holds a maximum capacity of 1,029 people. It can accommodate a variety of functions and performances, featuring its own catering kitchen, freight elevator, tables, chairs, portable dance floor, moveable platform staging and a lighting, audio, video, and projection systems.

Sculpture Park
Sculpture Park is located at the southwest corner of the complex at N. Speer Blvd. and Champa St.
Often called 'the dancing aliens' locally because of the sculptures' scale, the official name is:
Dancers by Jonathan Borofsky. The sculpture consists of two 60-foot silver-colored dancers made of steel and fiberglass.

See also
 List of concert halls

References

External links 
  Denver Performing Arts Complex's official website

Buildings and structures in Denver
Theatres in Denver
Performing arts centers in Colorado
Concert halls in Colorado
Tourist attractions in Denver